The 1995–96 FA Trophy was the twenty-seventh season of the FA Trophy.

Calendar

First qualifying round

Ties

Replays

2nd replays

Second qualifying round

Ties

Replays

2nd replay

Third qualifying round

Ties

Replays

2nd replay

1st round
The teams that given byes to this round are Woking, Macclesfield Town, Southport, Altrincham, Stevenage Borough, Kettering Town, Gateshead, Halifax Town, Runcorn, Northwich Victoria, Kidderminster Harriers, Bath City, Bromsgrove Rovers, Farnborough Town, Dagenham & Redbridge, Dover Athletic, Welling United, Stalybridge Celtic, Telford United, Hednesford Town, Morecambe, Slough Town, Merthyr Tydfil, Yeovil Town, Marine, Guiseley, Enfield, Cheltenham Town, Rushden & Diamonds, Hyde United, Colwyn Bay and Kingstonian.

Ties

Replays

2nd replays

3rd replays

2nd round

Ties

3rd round

Ties

Replays

2nd replay

4th round

Ties

Semi finals

First leg

Second leg

Final

Tie

References

General
 Football Club History Database: FA Trophy 1995-96

Specific

1995-96
1995–96 domestic association football cups
League